James Nicholas Allan  (22 May 1932 – 18 September 2018) was a British diplomat, High Commissioner in Mauritius (1981–1985) and ambassador to Mozambique (1986–1989).

Background
Allan was the son of Morris Edward Allan and Joan Bach, and a half-brother of Lord Bach.

Education
Allan was educated at Gresham's School, Holt, Norfolk, from 1946 to 1950, and at the London School of Economics from 1953 to 1956.

Career
1950-1953: National Service
1953-1956: London School of Economics
1956-1958: Assistant Principal, Commonwealth Relations Office, London
1958-1959: Third Secretary and Second Secretary, British High Commission to South Africa
1959-1961: Private Secretary to Parliamentary Under-Secretary
1961-1964: First Secretary, British High Commission to Sierra Leone
1964: British High Commission to Cyprus
1964-1968: Commonwealth Relations Office and Foreign and Commonwealth Office, London
1969-1971: Head of Chancery, British Embassy to China
1971-1973: Head of Chancery, British Embassy to Luxembourg
1973-1975: Counsellor in Northern Ireland Office, Belfast
1976-1977: Counsellor, Foreign and Commonwealth Office, London
1978-1979: Head of Overseas Information Department, Foreign and Commonwealth Office, London
December 1979 to March 1980: Governor's Staff, Salisbury, Rhodesia
1980-1981: Head of Overseas Information Department, Foreign and Commonwealth Office, London
1981-1985: High Commissioner in Mauritius
1984-1985: (simultaneously) Ambassador to the Comoro Islands
1986-1989: Ambassador to Mozambique
1989-1992: Senior Directing Staff, Royal College of Defence Studies, London

Family
In 1961, Allan married Helena Susara Crouse. They had one son, Nick Allan, and one daughter, Sarah. Mrs Allan died in 2001.

Honours
Commander of the Order of the British Empire, 1976
Companion of the Order of St Michael and St George, 1989

Club
He was a member of the Athenaeum Club, London.

References

Who's Who 2003 (A. & C. Black, London, 2003) page 27
Old Greshamian Club Address Book 1999 page 24

1932 births
2018 deaths
Alumni of the London School of Economics
People educated at Gresham's School
Companions of the Order of St Michael and St George
Commanders of the Order of the British Empire
Civil servants from London
Ambassadors of the United Kingdom to the Comoros
High Commissioners of the United Kingdom to Mauritius
Ambassadors of the United Kingdom to Mozambique
Civil servants in the Commonwealth Relations Office